Blythe Spirit is jazz saxophonist Arthur Blythe's fourth album for the Columbia label, recorded in New York City in 1981.

Reception
The AllMusic review by Scott Yanow states: "This is one of the most well-rounded Arthur Blythe records from his Columbia period... a fairly definitive Arthur Blythe recording, showing off his links to hard bop, r&b and the avant-garde". NME listed it as the 30th best album of 1981.

Track listing
All compositions by Arthur Blythe except as indicated
 "Contemplation" - 6:54     
 "Faceless Woman" - 6:41   
 "Reverence" - 6:25
 "Strike up the Band" (George Gershwin, Ira Gershwin) -  2:44    
 "Misty" (Johnny Burke, Erroll Garner) - 7:24   
 "Spirits in the Field" - 3:29     
 "Just a Closer Walk With Thee" (Traditional) - 5:25
Recorded at CBS Recording Studios, New York

Personnel
Arthur Blythe - alto saxophone 
Abdul Wadud - cello (tracks 1-4 & 6)
Kelvyn Bell - guitar (tracks 1-4)
Bob Stewart - tuba (tracks 1-4, 6 & 7)
John Hicks - piano (track 5)
Amina Claudine Myers - organ (track 7)
Fred Hopkins - bass (track 5)
Bobby Battle (tracks 1-4), Steve McCall (track 5) - drums

References

1981 albums
Columbia Records albums
Arthur Blythe albums